Dyfed Steels is a steel company based in Llanelli, Carmarthenshire, Wales.

They appeared in the Western Mail list of the top 300 businesses in Wales 2008.

In the year ending 31 January 2011, they recorded profits of £1.5m, having made a loss in the year before that.

References

External links
 Dyfed Steels website

Companies based in Carmarthenshire
Steel companies of the United Kingdom